ARA Piedrabuena (P-52) is the second ship of Argentinian Gowind-class offshore patrol vessel of the Argentinian Navy.

Development and design 

After repeated negotiations and break-offs, in February 2018 the Argentine Navy was instructed to restart negotiations with Naval Group for the procurement of four Gowind-class vessels. The decision was motivated by the meeting between Argentine President Mauricio Macri and French President Emmanuel Macron at the annual World Economic Forum summit in Davos, Switzerland. An order for four vessels was expected in July 2018. In November 2018, Argentina confirmed the purchase of four Gowind-class vessels. The purchase includes the already-built , which in 2016 visited the region on a marketing trip, and three new vessels.

Construction and career 
Piedrabuena was laid down in 2019 and launched on 1 October 2020 by DCNS in Lorient. The vessel began sea trials in March 2021. It was formally delivered to the Argentine Navy in April 2021.

See also 
 ARA Bouchard (P-51)

References 

2020 ships
Ships built in France
Patrol vessels of the Argentine Navy